Draw,  drawing,  draws,  or drawn may refer to:

Common uses
 Draw (terrain), a terrain feature formed by two parallel ridges or spurs with low ground in between them
 Drawing (manufacturing), a process where metal, glass, or plastic or anything else is stretched
 Wire drawing
Drawing, the result or the act of making an image with a writing utensil
 To select or wield:
 A part of many card games, to "draw" a card
 A part of a lottery, to "draw" a lottery number
 The act of wielding a weapon by removing from a sheath, to "draw" a knife or sword
 The act of wielding a weapon by removing from a holster, to "draw" a pistol
 Venipuncture

People 
 Stefanie Draws (born 1989), German footballer

Arts,  entertainment, and media

Music
 Draw, the debut album of Matthew Jay
 Drawn (album), a 1998 album by Regina Velasquez

Other arts, entertainment, and media
 Draw!, a 1984 comedy-western film
 Drawn (series), game series

Computing and technology
 Direct read after write (DRAW)
 OpenOffice.org Draw, a vector graphics editor
 Rendering (computer graphics), sometimes referred to as drawing

Sports and games 
 Draw (hockey), faceoff
 Draw (poker), the act of taking a card from the dealer in Poker
 Draw poker, a poker variant in which each player is dealt a complete hand before the first betting round
 Draw (tie), a result in competitions where there is either no winner or multiple winners
 Draw (chess), one of the possible outcomes of a chess game (a tie)
 Draw, the schedule of fixtures in a sports league
 Bow draw, the act of pulling back the string of a bow before loosing an arrow
 Draw play, a type of American football play that "tricks" the defense into thinking a pass is being thrown

Other uses
 Hanged, drawn and quartered, a form of punishment

See also 
 
 
 Draft (disambiguation)
 Draft lottery (disambiguation)
 Drawdown (disambiguation)
 Drawer (disambiguation)
 Drawing (disambiguation)
 Drew (disambiguation)
 Quick Draw (disambiguation)